Vallejera de Riofrío is a municipality located in the province of Salamanca, Castile and León, Spain. 
As of 2016 the municipality has a population of 67 inhabitants.

References

Municipalities in the Province of Salamanca